Pages is the fifth studio album by the Contemporary worship duo Shane & Shane. The album was released on August 28, 2007, by Inpop Records label, and the producer on the effort is Will Hunt.

Reception

Critical

Pages has received generally positive reviews from the music critics. Allmusic's Jared Johnson found that the duo on the release "stretch their legs in the pop realm and rely less on straightforward worship", but "there is little to distinguish this album from other worship projects out there". At CCM Magazine, Andy Conway opined that "Pages is honest, oftentimes in-your-face, deep and challenging" and shows "these guys are great writers/musicians." Linda Michaels of Christian Broadcasting Network called the release "Soulful and soothing, intimate and inspiring". At Christianity Today, Russ Breimeier noted that "Pages is as pretty, passionately performed, and worshipful as you'd expect from Shane & Shane, plus chock full of interesting ideas", however at the same time "the music isn't as compelling, and frankly, sometimes boring." Iain Nash of Cross Rhythms called this "a beautiful album filled to the brim with strong ballads, each song [reflecting] upon the salvation and freedom that can be experienced by resting in the presence of God." Jesus Freak Hideout's Jessica Gregorius proclaimed it to be a "spiritually satisfying release", and wrote that the duo "continue to amaze".

Commercial
For the week of September 8, 2007, Pages ranked as the 66th most-bought album in the United States on the Billboard 200 chart, and was the fifth most sold Christian Album.

Track listing

Charts

References

2007 albums
Inpop Records albums
Shane & Shane albums